Hay River may refer to:

Places
 Hay River, Northwest Territories
 Hay River, Wisconsin

Rivers
 Hay River (Wisconsin)
 Hay River (Canada), a river in Alberta and Northwest Territories, Canada
 Hay River, Northern Territory, Australia
 Hay River (Western Australia), a river in south-western Australia